Dime Quién Soy: Mistress of War is a Spanish historical drama television limited series created by José Manuel Lorenzo and Eduard Cortés for Movistar+ and Peacock, based on the novel of the same name by Julia Navarro. It was directed by Eduard Cortés and written by Piti Español. The series, which spans the Spanish Civil War, World War II and the Cold War, follows Amelia Garayoa, a Madrilenian socialite who is plunged into the world of international espionage.

The series premiered on December 4, 2020 on Movistar+.

Main cast
 Irene Escolar as Amelia Garayoa
 Oriol Pla as Pierre Comte
  as Max von Schumann
 Maria Pia Calzone as Carla Alessandrini 
 Will Keen as Albert James
 Oleg Kricunova as Krisov

Release
The first two episodes of the nine-part series premiered on Movistar+ on December 4, 2020. Episodes 3 to 5 were released on a weekly basis, and the last four episodes were released on January 1, 2021.

The first three episodes were previously screened at the 2020 San Sebastián International Film Festival on September 21, 2020.

In Latin America, the series aired on HBO Latin America and HBO Go from December 6, 2020. The series was acquired by DR in Denmark, Yle in Finland, NRK in Norway, RTP in Portugal, and Nova in Greece and Cyprus.

All nine episodes of the series were released March 8, 2021 in the United States on Peacock under the title Dime Quién Soy: Mistress of War in both Spanish and English.

References

External links

2020s Spanish drama television series
2020 Spanish television series debuts
2021 Spanish television series endings
Movistar+ network series
Espionage television series
Historical television series
Spanish-language television shows
Television series based on Spanish novels
Television series by DLO Producciones